Catholic Media Network, also known as CMN, is a Catholic radio network in the Philippines. CMN serves as the broadcasting arm of the Catholic Bishops' Conference of the Philippines, the governing body of the Roman Catholic Church in the Philippines.

History
CMN was previously known as Philippine Federation of Catholic Broadcasters (PFCB). The radio network was owned and operated by different Catholic broadcast media corporations.

In 1997, the name was changed to the Catholic Media Network to suit the network's mission and also the new slogan "The Spirit of The Philippines".

In October 2017, the House of Representatives threatened not to renew the 25-year franchise of the CBCP's broadcast radio operations (including some of the CMN member stations), citing criticism on the Duterte administration over war on drugs. However, CMN's de facto flagship station DZRV, was not part of it as it is operated by CBCP's affiliate Global Broadcasting System, which its franchise was already renewed by the Aquino administration a year earlier.

Eventually, in July 2019, CBCP broadcast franchise was renewed for 25 years after its respective bill was lapsed into law as President Rodrigo Duterte did not signed it within the period set by the Constitution.

Content
CMN content varies depending on the station from which it is being broadcast. Stations broadcast news, sports, radio drama, and other programs. As a network, CMN's mission statement is to use community-based broadcasting to promote New Evangelizing and human development. Content is anti-abortion, catholic, and community oriented.

Stations
CMN has 54 radio stations across the Philippines and its broadcasts reach 11 regions and 35 provinces. It is the largest broadcaster in the Philippines, in terms of total number of stations and transmitting power per station.

Most of its stations are operated by their respective dioceses either through CBCP or their dioceses' own media arms. These stations, along with its diocesan licensees and affiliates, form the network chain and these individual stations credit their promotions as "members of" and not "owned by" CMN.

AM stations
CMN's AM stations are grouped as Radyo Totoo, with the exception of DWAL in Batangas. Several provincial stations have their own local branding other than Radyo Totoo.

FM stations
CMN's FM stations are grouped as Spirit FM. Prior to 1997, these stations had their unique local branding. Majority of these stations carry a hybrid of masa & religious formats while some carry their own music formats (whether religious, Top 40 or country) and even a few function as an overflow station of their AM sister. Similar to its sister AM network, a few stations still operate under their own local branding other than Spirit FM.

CMN Radio

Notable diocesan/regional licensees and affiliates
 Notre Dame Broadcasting Corporation (Cotabato/Oblates of Mary Immaculate)
 Word Broadcasting Corporation (Cebu/Society of the Divine Word)
 Global Broadcasting System (Manila/Archdiocese of Manila)
 Radio Maria Philippines (Northern Luzon/Radio Maria)

International affiliations
EWTN Global Catholic Radio
The World Family of Radio Maria

References

External links
 Catholic Media Network Official website
DXDD WEBSITE
DZRV WEBSITE
Mirror site of CMN

Christian radio stations in the Philippines
Philippine radio networks
Radio stations in the Philippines
Catholic radio stations
Radio stations established in 1997